23 Envelope was the name given to the graphic design partnership of graphic designer Vaughan Oliver and photographer/filmmaker Nigel Grierson from 1980–1988. During this time, they created a distinct visual identity for the British independent music label 4AD through their record sleeve designs for bands such as Cocteau Twins, Dead Can Dance, and This Mortal Coil.

As 23 Envelope, Oliver primarily designed, while Grierson primarily photographed (occasionally, however, duties would be exchanged and/or overlap). With Grierson's departure in 1988, Oliver saw fit to retire the 23 Envelope moniker, and continue working under the name v23 with new partner Chris Bigg, and various design associates that would come to include Paul McMenamin, Timothy O'Donnell, Martin Andersen and others. Meanwhile, Grierson focused more on the moving image, directing music videos and TV commercials, both in London and the USA.

A quote from a 2000 article on Grierson by Rick Poynor explains some of the early history of Oliver and Grierson:

Publications featuring the work of 23 Envelope 
The work of 23 Envelope has been well-published in books and design magazines especially under Vaughan Oliver's name.
 Emigre, No. 9, edited by Rudy Vanderlans, 1988.
 Eye, No. 10, Vol. 3, edited by Rick Poynor, Wordsearch Ltd, 1993.
 Eye, No. 37, Vol. 10, edited by John L. Walters, Quantum Publishing, 2000.
 This Rimy River: Vaughn Oliver and Graphic Works 1988–94, by Vaughan Oliver and Vulva O'Reighan.
 Vaughan Oliver: Visceral Pleasure, by Rick Poynor, 2000.
 BBC Television Documentary Programme on 23 Envelope entitled 23 Envelope Presents. 1 hour.
 Photographs by Nigel Grierson, Dewi Lewis Publishing 2014.
 Passing Through by Nigel Grierson, Lost Press, 2020
 Lightstream by Nigel Grierson, Lost Press publishing, 2020

Notes 

Graphic design studios